Filousa may refer to:

Filousa Chrysochous, Paphos District, Cyprus
Filousa Kelokedaron, Paphos District, Cyprus